De Waele is a surname. Notable people with the surname include:

 Armand de Waele (1887–1966), British chemist
 Maurice De Waele (1896–1952), Belgian cyclist
 Bert De Waele (born 1975), Belgian cyclist
 Ellen De Waele (born 1973), Belgian film producer
Gustav De Waele(born 2008), Belgian actor

See also
 Dewaele